William J. Hall (born 1 June 1991) is a retired British professional basketball player, who formerly played for Glasgow Rocks of the British Basketball League.

Junior career
As a youth player, he played for England's national under-18 basketball team at the 2009 FIBA Europe Under-18 Championship Division B, Where he average 6.0 Points and 2.0 Assists in 2 games

Professional career

Europe
Hall began his career with Leeds Force , He finished the 2014-15 season averaging 14.2 points , 7.3 Rebounds and 2.5 Assists.

On 30 July 2015, Hall signed with Glasgow Rocks for the 2015-16 season. He appeared in thirty-six games averaging 12.6 Points, 6.9 Rebounds and 2.8 Assists.

On 26 September 2016, Hall signed a one-year deal with Obila CB of the Spanish LEB Plata. Hall had averaged 9.4 points, 5.5 rebounds and 1.4 assist after 2016-17 Spanish LEB Plata season.

References

External links
 Real GM Profile
 Eurobasket.com Profile

Videos
 William Hall Basketball 2011-2012  - Youtube.com Video

1991 births
Living people
British expatriate basketball people in Spain
English expatriate sportspeople in Spain
English men's basketball players
Glasgow Rocks players
Small forwards
Sportspeople from Sheffield